Afshin Biabangard (born 10 June 1987 in Parsabad, Ardabil Province, Iran) is an Iranian wrestler, bronze medalist of the world championships.

In 2006, won the bronze medal at the Asian championship among juniors. In 2012 he won the silver medal in the Asian Championship. In 2014 won the bronze medal at the World Cup and the Asian Games.

Notes

References
 Four Iranian GR wrestlers bag bronzes
 Iran Greco-Roman wrestlers to depart for South Korea

Living people
Asian Games bronze medalists for Iran
People from Ardabil Province
Iranian male sport wrestlers
Wrestlers at the 2014 Asian Games
Asian Games medalists in wrestling
World Wrestling Championships medalists
Medalists at the 2014 Asian Games
1987 births